Turkish civil code is one of the earliest laws in the history of Turkey within the scope of Turkish reforms.

Background

During the Ottoman Empire, the legal system of Turkey was Sharia like other Muslim countries. A committee headed by Ahmet Cevdet Pasha in 1877 compiled the rules of Sharia. Although this was an improvement, it still lacked modern concepts. Besides two different legal systems were adopted; one for the Muslim and the other for the non Muslim subjects of the empire.  After the proclamation of Turkish Republic on 29 October 1923, Turkey began to adopt modern laws.

Preparation
The Turkish parliament formed a committee to compare the civil codes of European countries. Austrian, German, French and Swiss civil codes were examined  Finally on 25 December 1925 the commission decided on the Swiss civil code as a model for the Turkish civil code. The Turkish Civil Code was enacted on 17 February 1926. The preamble to the Code was written by Mahmut Esat Bozkurt, the minister of justice in the 4th government of Turkey.

Women's rights
Although the Code covered many areas of modern living, the most important articles dealt with women’s rights. For the first time women and men were acknowledged to be equal. Under the prior legal system, both the women’s share in the inheritance and the weight of women’s testimony in the courts was half of that of the men. Under the Code, men and women were made equal with regard to inheritance and testimony.

Also legal marriage was made compulsory, and polygamy was banned. The women were given the right to choose any profession. The women gained full universal suffrage, on 5 December 1934.

See also
Gülkız Ürbül
Hatı Çırpan
Müfide İlhan

References

1926 in Turkey
Civil codes
Law of Turkey